Eddystone (or Eddistone) was launched at Hull in 1802. She then sailed for the North West Company. The French Navy captured her in 1806 but an armed ship of the Royal Navy recaptured her within weeks. She next sailed for the Hudson's Bay Company (HBC) from 1807 to about 1824. She then traded generally until May 1843 when she was wrecked.

Career
Eddystone first appeared in Lloyd's Register (LR) in 1802 with Featherstone, master and owner, and trade Hull–Baltic.

In 1803 John Fraser, one of the founders of the North West Company, purchased her. At the time, the North West company was challenging the HBC's monopoly on the fur trade at Hudson's Bay. The North West Company sent an overland expedition to the southern end of the bay, and sent Eddyston to meet it there. The Company then established a post on Charlton Island, on James Bay.

 
The French frigates  and  captured Eddystone, Sarman, master, on 13 September 1806 as she was sailing from Quebec to London. The French took out her captain, crew, and furs, which were the most valuable part of her cargo.  recaptured Eddystone off Cape Finisterre and sent her into Plymouth, where she arrived in early October.
 
By 1807 the North West Company had given up its operations at Charlton Island. The problem was not the HBC's opposition but rather was one of lack of trade. In 1807 the HBC purchased Eddystone and appointed Captain Thomas Ramsey as her master. Captain Thomas Ramsey acquired a letter of marque on 2 May 1808. 
 

In 1811 and 1813 Eddystone and  carried settlers to Hudson Bay. In 1815, Eddystone became trapped in the lower part of Hudson Bay and had to overwinter there.
 
Eddystone could not approach because of the state of the sea. Eddystone was carrying a cargo of timber and furs.

In June 1836 Eddystone, Kearsley, master, grounded in the river at Newport, Wales, at the outset of a voyage to Savannah. It appeared her bottom might have been broken and she had to discharge and effect repairs.

Fate
Eddystone was wrecked on 19 May 1843. She was driven ashore and wrecked at Point May, Newfoundland. Her crew were rescued. She was on a voyage from Liverpool, Lancashire to Quebec City. Her entry in Lloyd's Register for 1843 carried the annotation "LOST".

Notees, citations, and references
Notes

Citations

References
 
 

1802 ships
Age of Sail merchant ships of England
Captured ships
Hudson's Bay Company ships
Migrant ships to Canada
Maritime incidents in June 1836
Maritime incidents in May 1843